Alger Centre is a municipality in Algiers Province, Algeria. It is administratively part of Sidi M'Hamed district,  and it has a population of 96,329 as of the 1998 census, which gives it 15 seats in the PMA.

Name
The name of the municipality is officially bilingual (French: Alger Centre). The French name means "Algiers-Center" and the first version of the Arabic name means Central Algiers, and the later means "Center of Algiers". True to its name, this municipality forms the downtown of Algiers, and the port of Algiers is also located there.

Notable people

 Ahmed Mahsas (1923–2013)

References

Communes of Algiers Province